The 1952 Tour de Romandie was the sixth edition of the Tour de Romandie cycle race and was held from 17 April to 20 April 1952. The race started and finished in Payerne. The race was won by Wout Wagtmans.

General classification

References

1952
Tour de Romandie